Liberia School is a historic Rosenwald School located near Warrenton, Warren County, North Carolina.  It was built in 1921–1922, and is a one-teacher frame school building.  It measures approximately 20 feet by 32 feet.  It has a hipped roof and small porch with a gable roof.  The school remained open until the early 1950s. The Liberia School is one of 25 schools that were constructed using Rosenwald funds in Warren County. It was listed on the National Register of Historic Places in 2005.

References 

Rosenwald schools in North Carolina
School buildings on the National Register of Historic Places in North Carolina
School buildings completed in 1922
Buildings and structures in Warren County, North Carolina
National Register of Historic Places in Warren County, North Carolina
1922 establishments in North Carolina